The Skylands Region (simply known as Skylands) is a region of New Jersey located in the Northern and Central part of the state.  It is one of six tourism regions established by the New Jersey State Department of Tourism; the others are Gateway Region, Greater Atlantic City Region, the Southern Shore Region, the Delaware River Region, and the Shore Region. 

The Skylands Region officially encompasses Hunterdon, Morris, Somerset, Sussex and Warren counties; the northwestern part of the Passaic County fits in with the Skylands Region, but it is part of the Gateway Region and not the Skylands Region. One could also say that the westernmost part of Bergen (in the Ramapo Mountains) is also part of the Skylands. The area features uplifted land, rolling hills and mountains characteristic of North Jersey.  The region contains 60,000 acres (240 km²) of state parkland and a diverse geography filled with lakes, rivers, and picturesque hills.

Climate
This region is considered by Köppen to be Humid Continental (Dfb).

Places and events
Allamuchy Freight House
Allamuchy Mountain State Park
Central Railroad of New Jersey main line
Columbia Trail
Delaware Water Gap and Delaware Water Gap National Recreation Area (on New Jersey side of Pennsylvania-New Jersey border)
Duke Farms
Great Swamp National Wildlife Refuge
Hacklebarney State Park
High Point State Park
High Point
Hopatcong State Park
Jenny Jump State Forest
Jenny Jump Mountain
Land of Make Believe
Kittatinny Mountain
Kittatinny Valley State Park
Lackawanna Cut-Off
Lake Hopatcong
Lake Musconetcong
Lehigh Line
Musconetcong Mountain
Musconetcong River
Musconetcong Tunnel 
New Jersey State Fair
Red Mill
Ringwood Manor
Ringwood State Park
Round Valley Reservoir
Space Farms Zoo and Museum
Spruce Run Recreation Area
Stokes State Forest
Sussex Branch Rail Trail
Swartswood State Park
The Sourlands
Sourland Mountain
Sourland Mountain Preserve
Wallkill River
Wallkill River National Wildlife Refuge
Waterloo Village, New Jersey
Wild West City
Schooley's Mountain
Skylands estate
Somerset Patriots/TD Bank Ballpark
Sussex County Miners/Skylands Stadium
Voorhees State Park

See also
Ridge-and-Valley Appalachians
New York-New Jersey Highlands
Piedmont

References

External links

 The High Point of New Jersey: The Skylands Region
 New Jersey Skylands
 Skylands Tourism Council
 New Jersey Highlands Coalition

Tourism in New Jersey
Regions of New Jersey
Tourism regions of New Jersey
North Jersey
Highlands